Cerophytum is a genus of rare click beetles in the family Cerophytidae. There are at least four described species in Cerophytum.

Species
These four species belong to the genus Cerophytum:
 Cerophytum convexicolle LeConte, 1866
 Cerophytum elateroides (Latreille, 1804)
 Cerophytum japonicum Sasaji, 1999
 Cerophytum pulsator (Haldeman, 1845)

References

Further reading

 
 

Elateroidea
Articles created by Qbugbot